Fernando Ciangherotti Jr. (born September 6, 1959) is a Mexican television soap opera actor. He is the son of Fernando Luján.

Awards
TVyNovelas Award for Best Supporting Actor (1993)

References

External links
 

1959 births
Living people
Mexican male telenovela actors
Mexican people of Italian descent
Male actors from Mexico City